Viridis Visconti (1352–1414) was an Italian noblewoman, a daughter of the Lord of Milan, Bernabò Visconti, and his wife Beatrice Regina della Scala. By her marriage to Leopold III, Duke of Austria, Viridis was Duchess consort of Austria, Styria and Carinthia, she was also Countess consort of Tyrol.

Family 
Viridis was born in Milan, Italy and was the second of seventeen children.

Her sister, Taddea Visconti married Stephen III, Duke of Bavaria and was mother of Isabeau of Bavaria, wife of Charles VI of France. Viridis and the rest of her sisters secured politically advantageous marriages.

Her maternal grandparents were Mastino II della Scala and his wife Taddea da Carrara. Her paternal grandparents were Stefano Visconti and his wife Valentina Doria.

Viridis' father, Bernabò was described as a cruel and ruthless despot. He was also an implacable enemy of the Church. He seized the papal city of Bologna, rejected the Pope and his authority, confiscated ecclesiastical property, and forbade any of his subjects to have any dealings with the Curia. He was excommunicated as a heretic in 1363 by Pope Urban V, who preached crusade against him. When Bernabò was in one of his frequent rages, only the children's mother, Beatrice Regina, was able to approach him.

Marriage 

Viridis married Leopold III, Duke of Austria, son of Albert II, Duke of Austria and his wife Johanna of Pfirt. The couple had seven children:
William the Courteous
Leopold IV the Fat
Ernest the Iron
Frederick IV of the Empty Pockets
Elisabeth (1378–1392)
Margaretha (1370–?)
Catherine (1385–?), Abbess of St. Klara in Vienna

Viridis was widowed in 1386 and so their eldest son, William became Duke of Austria.

William's engagement to Jadwiga of Hungary, youngest daughter of the neighboring king, was one of the first attempts of the House of Habsburg to extend their sphere of influence in Eastern Central Europe by marrying heiresses, a practice that gave rise to the phrase Bella gerant alii: tu felix Austria nube (Let others make war: thou happy Austria, marry). The wedding was broken off.

Viridis died on 1 March 1414 and out-lived at least three of seven children, since her younger daughter, Katherine's date of death is unknown. Viridis is buried in Stična (Sittich) in Lower Carniola, present-day Slovenia.

Ancestry

References

Sources

External links

1352 births
1414 deaths
Viridis
Austrian royal consorts
14th-century House of Habsburg
15th-century House of Habsburg
14th-century Italian women
14th-century Italian nobility
15th-century Austrian women
14th-century Austrian women